Raipur, is a village in the Kabirwala Tehsil of Khanewal District in 
Punjab, Pakistan. It is famous as the birthplace of Indian American Nobel Laureate Har Gobind Khorana. 

After Partition of India, it was renamed as Gajani.

Geography

The village is situated in the Khanewal in the Pakistani Punjab, having the average elevation of 128 metres.

References

Populated places in Khanewal District